Drumb Mansruin (otherwise known as Drumb) is a 1996 solo EP by Melvins' drummer Dale Crover. It was released under the independent label Man's Ruin Records (MR004), was printed on blue vinyl, and is only about 12 minutes long. It is most notable for being Crover's only solo output. Few pressings were made and the album is no longer being sold. The A-side is several minutes of drums and noise. The B-side is the A-side reversed. The cover art is by Frank Kozik

Track listing
 "Forwards (Four Words)" (Crover) – 5:45
 "Backwards (Back Words)" (Crover) – 5:51

Personnel
Dale Crover - vocals, producer
Joe Barresi - engineer, producer
Geetus "Guido South" Aguto - assistant engineer
Mike "Elvis" Smith - assistant engineer
Billy Anderson -digital editing

References
Drumb page on themelvins.net

Dale Crover albums
1996 EPs
Man's Ruin Records EPs